Prince Edward Island Route 15 is a secondary highway in central Prince Edward Island.

Route 15 follows Brackley Point Road beginning at the junction with the Charlottetown Perimeter Highway (Trans-Canada Highway, Route 1). The route passes near the Charlottetown Airport, then proceeds north through the community of Brackley Beach. Route 15 terminates at the north shore, turning east and becoming the un-numbered Gulf Shore Parkway.

When the Charlottetown Perimeter Highway was constructed, Route 2 was reassigned to the new road, and the Route 15 designation was dropped from Brackley Point Road south of the new ring road.

Major intersections

References 

015
015